Katedralen Canyon is an ice-filled canyon with steep rock cliffs indenting the northwest side of Jøkulkyrkja Mountain, in the Mühlig-Hofmann Mountains of Queen Maud Land, Antarctica. It was plotted from surveys and air photos by the Sixth Norwegian Antarctic Expedition (1956–60) and named Katedralen (the cathedral).

References

Canyons and gorges of Antarctica
Landforms of Queen Maud Land
Princess Astrid Coast